Charnier is a French surname, and a French word for charnel house.

Charnier or variation, may also refer to:

People
 Claude Charnier, Canadian musician and member of Headscan
 Daniel Charnier, a Huguenot; see List of Huguenots
 Madeleine Charnier (1919—2002), a French zoologist

Fictional characters
 Alain Charnier, a fictional character from the film The French Connection (film)

Other uses
 The Charnel House, a Picasso painting that he painted while living in France
 Les Charniers, an 1884 work by Valère Bernard published in French and Occitan

See also

 Pointe Rochers Charniers, Cottian Alps, France; a mountain
 
 Charnel House (disambiguation)
 Tomb (disambiguation)
 Crypt (disambiguation)
 Catacomb (disambiguation)

Sephardic surnames
Names